

Events

January events
 January 20 – The Grand Trunk Western Railroad opens a passenger depot in Lansing, Michigan.
 January 28 – Esmond Train Wreck: fourteen people are killed when the Crescent City Express (No. 8, bound for Benson, Arizona) collides head-on with the bound Pacific Coast Express (No. 7, bound for Tucson).

February events
 February 12 – North British Locomotive Company established as a locomotive builder in Glasgow, Scotland, by merger of Dübs and Company, Neilson, Reid and Company, and Sharp Stewart and Company. In April it receives its first new order for steam locomotives, from India.

March events
 March 3 – Baker valve gear for steam locomotives is first patented in the United States.

April events
 April 7 – Apalachicola Northern Railroad, later to become AN Railway, is chartered.

May events
 May 3 – The Mersey Railway, operating between Birkenhead and Liverpool by tunnel beneath the River Mersey, England, converts from steam to electric traction.
 May 13 – The Fremont, Elkhorn and Missouri Valley Railroad (later to become part of Chicago and North Western Railway) begins passenger train service to Casper, Wyoming.
 May 25 – The Lackawanna and Wyoming Valley Railroad opens, becoming the first railroad in the United States to use an electrified third rail to power its trains.

July events 
 July – Regular passenger traffic from Saint Petersburg to Vladivostok over the Trans-Siberian and Chinese Eastern Railways begins.
 July 1 – Opening of the Albula Railway portion of the Rhaetian Railway (RhB) (metre gauge) in Switzerland, passing through the Albula Tunnel, the highest of the principal Alpine tunnels at 1370 m.
 July 13 – Danbury Union Station in Danbury, Connecticut, on the New York, New Haven and Hartford Railroad, opens.
 July 27
 Construction begins on the Baghdad Railway with the  segment between Konya and Bulgurlu in the Ottoman Empire (modern day Turkey).
 Glasgow St Enoch rail accident, Scotland: sixteen killed when a train crashes into the buffers.

August events
 August 10 – Paris Metro train fire, France: electric fire on Paris Métro at Couronnes; 84 killed.
 August 17 – The Great Western Railway becomes the first British railway company to operate its own "road motor services" (i.e. buses), between Helston and The Lizard in Cornwall.

September events

 September 27 – Wreck of the Old 97, Danville, Virginia, United States: A southbound Southern Railway passenger train derails on a trestle in Danville; eleven people are killed.

October events
 October – Experimental electric trains, built by AEG and Siemens & Halske, reach 210.2 km/h (130.6 mph) between Marienfelde and Zossen in Germany.
 October 1
 The first railway in Norway rebuilt to double track, from Bryn to Lillestrøm on the Hovedbanen, is opened.
 The Gold Coast Government Railway is extended from Obuasi to Kumasi.
 October 21 – Howard Elliott succeeds Charles Sanger Mellen as president of Northern Pacific Railway.
 October 31 – The Purdue Wreck, Indianapolis, Indiana, USA: A Cleveland, Cincinnati, Chicago, and St. Louis Railroad football special carrying the Purdue University football team and fans to the annual game with Indiana University collides with a coal train. Fourteen of the team and three other passengers are killed.

November events 

 November 9 – The  gauge Kalka-Shimla Railway opens in India.

December events 
 December 14 – The New York, New Haven and Hartford introduces the all-parlor car Merchants Limited between Boston and New York City.

Unknown date events
 The British Engineering Standards Committee draws up specifications for eight standard steam locomotive designs for the broad gauge Indian Railways.
 Southern Pacific Railroad gains 50% control of the Pacific Electric system in Los Angeles, California.
 The Wilkes-Barre and Hazleton Railway opens as the first railroad to have a guarded third rail.
 The provisions of the US Railroad Safety Appliance Act, enacted in 1893, are extended to include all railroad cars whether or not the cars themselves are used in interchange service.
 Atchison, Topeka and Santa Fe Railway introduces the first 2-10-2 compound locomotives (built by Baldwin Locomotive Works) into service.
 E. H. Harriman becomes president of the Union Pacific Railroad.
 George Whale succeeds Francis William Webb as Chief Mechanical Engineer of the London and North Western Railway.

Accidents

Births

April births 
 April 10 – Edward T. Reidy, last president of Chicago Great Western Railway 1957–1968.

Deaths

March deaths 
 March 29 – Gustavus Franklin Swift, founder of Swift and Company which pioneered the use of refrigerator cars in late 19th century America (born 1839)

July deaths
 July 27 – Frederick J. Kimball, American civil engineer who was instrumental in the formation of Norfolk and Western (born 1844).

Unknown date deaths
 J. Elfreth Watkins, railroad civil engineer and first curator for the Smithsonian Institution's railroad artifacts including John Bull.

References